Amos Marah Kicmett (born January 1, 1984) is a Liberian former professional footballer.

References

External links

1984 births
Living people
Liberian footballers
Association football forwards
Expatriate footballers in Indonesia
Liga 1 (Indonesia) players
Deltras F.C. players
Liberian expatriates in Indonesia
Indonesian Premier Division players
Persibo Bojonegoro players
Gresik United players
PSS Sleman players
Persid Jember players
PSSB Bireuen players
Persikab Bandung players
Persiraja Banda Aceh players
Liberia international footballers